Professor William Dittmar FRS FRSE LLD (1833 – 1892) was a German-born scientist renowned as a chemical analyst. He was based largely in Scotland. He did much analytical work on the findings from the Challenger expedition.

He was the first to confirm the Principle of Constant Proportions, a theory first conjectured in 1865 by Johan Georg Forchhammer regarding the major ions of sea-water: that whilst salinity varied across the oceans, the ratios of ionic abundance remained constant. As a result, the Principle is often called "Dittmar's Principle" or "Forchhammer's Principle". His research also included calculations of the atomic weight of platinum.

Life
He was born in Umstadt near Darmstadt in western Germany on 14/15 April 1833, the son of Fritz Dittmar an Assessor at Umstadt. In 1848 he was apprenticed as a pharmacist at the Hof Apotheker in Darmstadt.

In 1857, went to work in the illustrious Bunsen laboratory in Heidelberg, and his focussed changed to chemical analysis. Here he met Henry Enfield Roscoe who brought him back to Britain with him to work as his assistant at Owen's College in Manchester, Roscoe then being Professor of Chemistry there. In 1861 he received a post as Chief Laboratory Assistant in the Chemistry Department of the University of Edinburgh and stayed there until 1869.

In 1863, he was elected a Fellow of the Royal Society of Edinburgh, his Proposer being Lyon Playfair, 1st Baron Playfair. He served as a Counillor to the Society 1868-9. In 1882 he was also elected a Fellow of the Royal Society of London.

In 1869, he took a break from the UK and returned to Germany, and worked in the Poppelsdorf district of Bonn as a lecturer in meteorology at the local Agricultural College. In 1872 he declined the Chair in Chemistry at Kassel instead wishing to await for a post back in the United Kingdom. In 1873 he returned to Owen’s College as a lecturer, but then moved to the Andersonian college in Glasgow as a full Professor in 1874, a post he then held until death.

The University of Edinburgh awarded him an honorary doctorate (LLD) in 1887. He died suddenly at home, 11 Hillhead Street in Hillhead, Glasgow on 9 March 1892, shortly after returning from giving his morning lecture. His obituary in the Royal Society of Edinburgh was written and delivered by Alexander Crum Brown.

Publications
A Manual of Chemical Analysis (1874)
Composition of Ocean Water (1884)

Family
Dittmar’s son, also William Dittmar (1859-1951) came with him to Britain and is thought to have also been a chemist.

References

1833 births
1892 deaths
Scientists from Hesse
19th-century Scottish scientists
Fellows of the Royal Society of Edinburgh
Fellows of the Royal Society
People from Groß-Umstadt
Academics of the University of Strathclyde